Andrew J. Love (September 2, 1907 - March 5, 1986) was an American professional baseball right fielder and first baseman in the Negro leagues. He played with the Detroit Stars in 1930 and 1931, and the Washington Pilots in 1932.

References

External links
 and Seamheads

Detroit Stars players
Washington Pilots players
1907 births
1986 deaths
Baseball outfielders
Baseball first basemen
Baseball players from Alabama
20th-century African-American sportspeople